The High Performance Knowledge Bases (HPKB) was a DARPA research program to advance the technology of how computers acquire, represent and manipulate knowledge.  The successor of the HPKB project was the Rapid Knowledge Formation (RKF) project.

The primary results of the HPKB project was to focus further research on the Knowledge acquisition bottleneck problem.

HPKB was divided programmatically into three groups:

 Integrators
 Technology developers
 Challenge problem developers

See also 
 Knowledge base
 Cyc - commercial knowledge base
 OpenCyc - Open Source version of Cyc
 Electronic Directory Research (EDR) - Japanese large knowledge base effort
 Project Halo - Ultimate successor project
 Rapid Knowledge Formation (RKF)- follow-on project
 SUMO - Suggested Upper Merged Ontology
 Wikipedia - example of large knowledge base that is not yet semantically parsable
 WordNet - a semantic network of words, terms used in the English language

External links 
  DARPA HPKB Home Page
 Cohen,P., Schrag, R., Jones, E., Pease, A., Lin, A., Starr, B., Gunning, D. and Burke, M. DARPA High-Performance Knowledge Bases Project AI Magazine Volume 19 Number 4 (1998)

References 
Web Intelligence: First Asia-Pacific Conference, Wi 2001, Maebashi City, Japan, October 23–26, by N Zhong, Y Yao, J Liu

DARPA